Gabriele Sforza (born Carlo Sforza; 1423–1457), was a member of the Augustinian Order who served as Archbishop of Milan from 1445 to his death in 1457.

Family 

His father was Giacomo Muzio Attendolo, who had three marriages and sixteen children: one child with his first wife Antonia Salimbeni, three children with his second wife Caterina Alopo; two children (including Carlo) with his third wife Maria Marzani countess of Celano; and ten children with his mistresses Tamira di Cagli and Lucia Terzani da Marsciano.  Muzio Attendolo earned the nickname Sforza ("Strong") on the battlefield, which became the family surname under his son Francesco I Sforza , who was the Duke of Milan from 1450 to 1466. Francesco I Sforza had as sibling Carlo, who took the religious name of Gabriele.

Biography 
Carlo, born on 15 June 1423, spent the early part of his life serving in the military, but soon grew tired of the secular life.  He preferred studying the scriptures to fighting on the battlefield. On 18 January 1442 he entered the Augustinian Monastery of San Salvatore di Selva di Lago located outside Siena. He received the sacrament of Holy orders under Girolamo Buonsignori, the Prior of the Monastery, and took the name Gabriele di Cotignola or Gabriele Sforza as he is now known.  At the Monastery he dedicated himself to his studies and wrote various religious epistles, orations, moral treatises, essays on the gospels and four books on Scholastic Theology.  His achievements did not go unnoticed, and he was soon appointed to serve as a religious teacher at the Monastery.

His brother Francesco later obtained for him by Pope Nicholas V the appointment, on 20 June 1545, as Archbishop of Milan. Gabriele accepted unwillingly, and was consecrated bishop in the church of Santa Maria Incoronata on 28 July 1454 by Giovanni Castiglione bishop of Pavia.

In 1456 the Archbishop began paying pastoral visits to the parishes of the Archdiocese of Milan.  In order to respond to the needs of his people, he urged his brother Francesco to build the Ospedale Maggiore, one of the first community hospitals in Europe.

Gabriele Sforza died on 12 September 1457 in Milan and was buried in the church of Santa Maria Incoronata, Milan, which his brother had commissioned. His funerary monument was created by Francesco Solari.

Because of his dedication to faith, Gabriele Sforza was sometime later considered as blessed, even if he had no liturgical memory.

References 

1423 births
1457 deaths
Augustinian friars
Archbishops of Milan
15th-century Italian Roman Catholic archbishops